EM TV can refer to:

 EM TV, a commercial television station in Papua New Guinea
 Controversial TV, a former commercial television station in the United Kingdom previously known as Edge Media Television
 Constantin Medien AG (formerly EM.TV & Merchandising AG), a German media group.